André Mama Fouda, born on 24 July 1951, in Yaoundé (Cameroon), is a Cameroonian engineer and politician. He has been the Minister of Health since 2007.

Biography 
Born in the Obobogo district of Yaoundé, Fouda attended secondary school at Francois-Xavier Vogt secondary school there. After a baccalaureate (scientific section) in 1971, he entered the National Polytechnic School of Yaoundé (ENSP) and in 1974 obtained a degree in civil engineering (option public works and buildings).

He is married to Atangana Yvonne Mariette, and together they have four children. He is a practicing Catholic.

Career 
Fouda's career began on 1 January 1974, at the Société immobilière du Cameroun (SIC) as an operational engineer. In the 1990s, he assumed the position of Acting Director general.

From August 1991 to September 2007, he was the Director General of the Urban and Rural Land Development and Equipment Mission (MAETUR).

In 2007, he became the Minister of Public Health for the government of Philemon Yang.

Politics 

In March 2008, he became vice-president of Cameroon's ruling party (Cameroon People's Democratic Movement (CPDM) of Mfoundi 3).

Controversies and criticisms 

His activities and decisions at the Ministry of Health have been criticized.

Distinctions 

 Gold Medal of Labor.
 2007: Officer of the Order of Value.

References 

1951 births
People from Yaoundé
Cameroon People's Democratic Movement politicians
Government ministers of Cameroon
Living people